The 1920 Southwestern Louisiana Industrial football team was an American football team that represented the Southwestern Louisiana Industrial Institute (now known as the University of Louisiana at Lafayette) in the Louisiana Intercollegiate Athletic Association during the 1920 college football season. In their only year under head coach Herbert O. Tudor, the team compiled a 2–8 record.

Schedule

References

Southwestern Louisiana
Louisiana Ragin' Cajuns football seasons
Southwestern Louisiana Industrial football